David Francis (born 12 November 1958) is an Australian novelist, lawyer and academic.

Life 
David Francis was born in the Mornington Bush Nursing Hospital in Victoria, Australia on 12 November 1958. His mother, Judith Francis, was a prominent Australian horsewoman. Francis spent much of his early life between Mount Eliza, where he attended The Peninsula School, and his family farm, "Tooradin Estate".

Francis studied arts and law at Monash University in Melbourne where he received his BA and LLB. After graduating, Francis worked as a solicitor at Allens Arthur Robinson in Melbourne for two years. In 1985, Francis represented Australia in an equestrian team competing in Europe. He subsequently travelled to the US where he rode the US show-jumping circuit just outside New York.

Francis is currently based in Los Angeles where he works for the law firm of Fulbright & Jaworski and is on the board of directors of PEN American Center. He has taught creative writing at Occidental College, University of California (Los Angeles campus) and for the Masters of Professional Writing program at University of Southern California. He spends part of each year in Australia and also at the Cité internationale des arts in Paris.

Novels and literary career 
Francis started writing fiction in 1996.  His first novel, Agapanthus Tango, tells the story of the travels of a 12-year-old boy, named Day, when he sets out on his horse after his mother dies. Agapanthus Tango was first published by HarperCollins/Fourth Estate in the United Kingdom and then by HarperCollins in Australia.  Since then, it has been translated, and re-published, in Germany (2002), Italy (2002), Holland (2002) and France (2004). In 2005 it was published in the United States with the new title, The Great Inland Sea, by MacAdam/Cage. In 2006, the French company, Serena Films, purchased the film rights for the novel.

Writing for The Washington Post, Jeff Turrentine described The Great Inland Sea as "a bowl of ripe cherries: graceful and unaffected…we should be grateful for stories of this scale, crafted by writers of this skill". The San Francisco Chronicle featured The Great Inland Sea as an "Editor's recommendation", writing: "David Francis may not be a poet, but he sure writes like one. His prose is lean but dreamy, full of sensual detail [...] It's all done with skill and elegance."

In 2008, Francis's second novel, Stray Dog Winter was published Allen & Unwin in Australia, and by MacAdam/Cage in the US The novel centres on a love story that is set in 1980s Moscow. Booklist described Stray Dog Winter as "Vibrant with the discordant images of political repression and smoldering sexuality, Francis ethereally transports readers to a preternatural time where nothing and no one are what they seem". Los Angeles Magazine said "Francis's prose has the sparse elegance of a Xeriscape.  Every detail holds water". The Australian Book Review called it "An impressive political thriller, beautifully crafted with a spectacular climax." Stray Dog Winter was named as a 2008 "Book of the Year" in The Advocate, "Australian Novel of the Year" in the Australian Literary Review (2008), and was a Lambda Literary Award finalist in 2009.

Francis's work has appeared in The Sydney Morning Herald, The Age, The Elegant Variation, Wet Ink, The Advocate, the Southern California Review, Best Australian Short Stories (2010), Griffith Review, Meanjin and The Harvard Review.

Achievements and awards 
 2002. Awarded the Australian Literature Fund Fellowship to the Kessing Studio in Paris.
 2010 Commendation of the Fellowship of Australian Writers National Literary Award.
 2010 American Library Association, Barbara Gittings Literature Award.

List of works

Novels 
 Agapanthus Tango – 
 Great Inland Sea – 
 Stray Dog Winter  –

Short Fiction (includes) 
 "How's It Going Peter Pan?" (Southern California Review (1.2), 2008)
 "Daisy on the Bridge" (Wet Ink, 2008)
 "Once Removed" (Best Australian Stories of 2010, Black Inc, 2010)
 "Parts Unknown"  – (Meanjin, 2012)

Non-fiction (includes) 
 "No Jesus Man" – Griffith Review, 2011

References

External links 
 www.straydogwinter.com

20th-century Australian novelists
20th-century Australian male writers
21st-century Australian novelists
Australian male novelists
Australian male short story writers
1958 births
Australian solicitors
Living people
20th-century Australian short story writers
21st-century Australian short story writers
People from Mount Eliza, Victoria
Monash Law School alumni
Occidental College faculty
University of Southern California faculty
21st-century Australian male writers
Stonewall Book Award winners